Victor Gervais (born March 13, 1969) is a Canadian former professional ice hockey centre. He is currently working as a scout for the Prince George Spruce Kings of the British Columbia Hockey League and was formerly the general manager and head coach of the Victoria Grizzlies.

Career
Gervais was drafted 187th overall in the 1989 NHL Entry Draft by the Washington Capitals but never played in the National Hockey League.

During his professional career, Gervais played in the American Hockey League for the Baltimore Skipjacks and Portland Pirates, the East Coast Hockey League for the Hampton Roads Admirals and Florence Pride and the International Hockey League for the Cleveland Lumberjacks and the Grand Rapids Griffins.

Gervais also played five seasons in the Deutsche Eishockey Liga in Germany for the Frankfurt Lions, playing a total of 266 games for Frankfurt. He also played roller hockey for the Anaheim Bullfrogs in both Roller Hockey International and Major League Roller Hockey between 1993 and 1998.

Career statistics

References

External links

1969 births
Living people
Anaheim Bullfrogs players
Baltimore Skipjacks players
Canadian ice hockey centres
Cleveland Lumberjacks players
Florence Pride players
Frankfurt Lions players
Grand Rapids Griffins (IHL) players
Hampton Roads Admirals players
Ice hockey people from British Columbia
Portland Pirates players
Seattle Thunderbirds players
Sportspeople from Prince George, British Columbia
Washington Capitals draft picks